British shadow factories were the outcome of the Shadow Scheme, a plan devised in 1935 and developed by the British Government in the buildup to World War II to try to meet the urgent need for more aircraft using technology transfer from the motor industry to implement additional manufacturing capacity.

The term 'shadow' was not intended to mean secrecy, but rather the protected environment they would receive by being staffed by all levels of skilled motor industry people alongside (in the shadow of) their own similar motor industry operations.

A directorate of Aeronautical Production was formed in March 1936 with responsibility for the manufacture of airframes as well as engines, associated equipment and armaments. The project was headed by Herbert Austin and developed by the Air Ministry under the internal project name of the Shadow Scheme. Sir Kingsley Wood  took responsibility for the scheme in May 1938, on his appointment as Secretary of State for Air in place of Lord Swinton.

Many more factories were built as part of the dispersal scheme designed to reduce the risk of a total collapse of production if what would otherwise be a major facility were bombed. These were not shadow factories, though some writers now use that name, believing wrongly that "shadow" refers to attempts to achieve a level of secrecy.

Purpose and use
It was impossible for these facilities to be secret, though they were camouflaged after hostilities began. They were war material production facilities built in "the shadow" of motor industry plants to facilitate technology transfer to aircraft construction and run, for a substantial management fee, in parallel under direct control of the motor industry business along with distributed facilities. General Erhard Milch, chief administrator of the Luftwaffe, was in Britain again in the autumn of 1937 inspecting new shadow factories in Birmingham and Coventry, RAF aeroplanes and airfields.

Background
Up until the middle of 1938, the Air Ministry had been headed by Lord Swinton. He had been forced by Prime Minister Neville Chamberlain to resign his position due to a lack of progress in re-arming the Royal Air Force, the result of obstruction by aging Lord Nuffield. Swinton's civil servants approached their new boss, Sir Kingsley Wood, and showed him a series of informal questions that they had asked since 1935 on the subject, such as those posed to Morris Motors with regard to aircraft engine production capability at their Cowley plant in Oxford. As it turned out, the specialised high-output engines required by the RAF were made by Armstrong Siddeley, Bristol Aeroplane, Napier and Rolls-Royce, all of which employed a high number of sub-contractors. Despite their new factories, protestations by Wolseley Aero Engines (Nuffield) and Alvis were ignored. Their products were not required. Engines were specified by the aircraft's designers. Nuffield did participate after Wood's appointment, providing the Castle Bromwich Factory and promising a thousand Spitfires by June 1940 but, after two years, management was so poor that when June 1940 arrived not one Spitfire had been produced there. Castle Bromwich was withdrawn from Nuffield by Beaverbrook and placed under the wing of Vickers.

Implementation
The plan had two parts:
Development of nine new factories. The government would build and equip the factories. Motor car companies would be asked to gain experience in the making of engine parts so, if war broke out, the new factories could immediately go into full production.
Extensions to existing factory complexes to allow either easier switching to aircraft industry capability, or production capacity expansion.

Under the plan, there was government funding for the building of these new production facilities, in the form of grants and loans. Key to the plan were the products and plans of Rolls-Royce, whose Merlin engine powered many of the key aircraft being developed by the Air Ministry, as well as Bristol's Hercules engine. Bristol Aeroplane would not allow shadow factories to build complete engines, only components. The exception was Austin.

The first motor manufacturers chosen for engine shadows were: Austin, Daimler, Humber (Rootes Securities), Singer, Standard, Rover and Wolseley. In the event Lord Nuffield took Wolseley out of the arrangement and Singer proved to be in serious financial difficulty.

The buildings
Wood handed the overall project implementation to the Directorate of Air Ministry Factories, appointing Herbert Austin to lead the initiative (most of the facilities to be developed were alongside existing motor vehicle factories), and the technical liaison with the aircraft industry to Charles Bruce-Gardner. He also handed the delivery of the key new factory in Castle Bromwich, that was contracted to deliver 1,000 new Supermarine Spitfires to the RAF by the end of 1940, to Lord Nuffield, though in May 1940 the responsibility had to be taken from Nuffield and given to Vickers.

Office accommodation was brick, and wherever possible faced a main road. These buildings were extremely adaptable and would remain part of the British industrial landscape for more than 50 years.

The new factory buildings were models of efficient factory layout. They had wide, clear gangways and good lighting, and they were free of shafting and belt drives. The five shadow factories in Coventry were all in production by the end of October 1937 and they were all making parts of the Bristol Mercury engine. By January 1938 two of those shadow factories were producing complete airframes. In July 1938 the first bomber completely built in a shadow factory (Austin's) was flown in front of Sir Kingsley Wood, Secretary of State for Air. It was said eight shadow factories constructing aircraft components were in production in or near Coventry in February 1940.

As the scheme progressed, and after the death of Austin in 1941, the Directorate of Air Ministry Factories, under the auspices of the Ministry of Aircraft Production (MAP), gradually took charge of the construction of the buildings required for aircraft production. In early 1943 the functions of the directorate of Air Ministry Factories were transferred to the Ministry of Works.
Scotland
There were three waves of construction of shadow factories and only the third and smallest reached Scotland in the shape of the factory at Hillington producing Rolls-Royce's Merlin engines. Ferranti's factory in Crewe Toll, Edinburgh will have been secret.
Empire
Similar plans were introduced in Canada, Australia, New Zealand and South Africa.

List of shadow factories (incomplete)

Strategic dispersal
The White Paper on Defence  published in February 1937 revealed that steps had been taken to reduce the risk of air attack delivering a knockout blow on sources of essential supplies, even at the cost of some duplication, by building new satellite plants which would also draw labour from congested as well as distressed areas. There were still areas of severe unemployment.

London Aircraft Production Group

In parallel with the Shadow Factory scheme, the London Aircraft Production Group (LAPG) was formed in 1940 by combining management of factories and workshops of 
Chrysler at Kew, 
Duple, 
Express Motor & Bodyworks Limited, 
Park Royal Coachworks and
London Transport. 
The major activity of the group was the production of Handley Page Halifax bombers for the RAF, ammunition, gun parts, armoured vehicles and spare parts for vehicles. The group was led by London Transport from their works at Chiswick, Aldenham Works and the new De Havilland factory at Leavesden, Hertfordshire, which had a large purpose-built factory and airfield (construction of both was authorised on 10 January 1940) for production, assembly and flight testing of completed Halifax bombers.

The following list of eight members of the London Aircraft Production Group was published in March 1945: This includes LAPG members with factories at Preston, Speke and Stockport.

English Electric in Preston
London Passenger Transport Board — made the centre section and installed fittings and equipment for the front part of the fuselage
Rootes Securities in Speke
Chrysler Motors — rear part of the fuselage
Express Motor and Body Works — intermediate wings and tail-plane
Duple Bodies and Motors — the shell and components for the front part of the fuselage
Park Royal Coachworks — outer wings
Fairey Aviation Company in Stockport
from May 1941 they took responsibility for final erection followed by the test flight and their first aircraft was airborne before the end of 1941. They were allotted their own aerodromes instead of sending aircraft to the Handley Page aerodrome.

At peak the group involved 41 factories and dispersal units, 660 subcontractors and more than 51,000 employees,

Ultimately output rose to 200 Halifaxes a month and the group provided something like 40 per cent of the nation's heavy bomber output. Halifax bombers dropped more than 200,000 tons of bombs.

Sir Frederick Handley Page's "thank you" to these "daughter" firms was a luncheon at The Dorchester at which the head of each firm received a silver model of a Halifax bomber and representative workmen received scrolls of commendation.

Due to the high priority placed on aircraft production, large numbers of workers were drafted with little experience or training in aircraft production, with over half the workforce eventually being female. At its peak the LAPG included 41 factories or sites, 600 sub-contractors and 51,000 employees, producing one aircraft an hour. The first Halifax from the LAPG was delivered in 1941 and the last, named London Pride, in April 1945.

Follow-on initiatives
The shadow factory proposals and implementation, particularly its rigidity when bombed, meant that other key areas of military production prepared their own dispersal factory plans:
Alvis had 20 sites in Coventry alone, producing vehicles and munitions.  Soon after the total destruction of the Alvis factory by enemy action in 1940 Alvis were operating eight dispersal factories and thus managed to resume deliveries of their most important products. They were allocated nine further dispersal factories following further enemy attacks and after Pearl Harbour at the end of 1941 Alvis organised, equipped and managed a new shadow factory to make variable pitch propeller hubs.
 Rover managed and controlled six shadow factories on behalf of the Government and ran eighteen different dispersal factories of their own.
 When the Birmingham Small Arms plant at Small Heath, the sole producer of service rifle barrels and main aircraft machine guns, was bombed by the Luftwaffe in August–November 1940, it caused delays in productions, which reportedly worried PM Churchill the most among all the industrial damage during the Blitz. The Government Ministry of Supply and BSA immediately began a process of production dispersal throughout Britain, through the shadow factory scheme. Later in the war BSA controlled 67 factories from its Small Heath office, employing 28,000 people operating 25,000 machine tools, and produced more than half the small arms supplied to Britain's forces during the war.
 In British India in 1942, a Small Arms Factory in Kanpur was built as a shadow for the Rifle Factory Ishapore.

List of dispersal factories (incomplete)

Extent
In June 1939 the response to a question in parliament was: 31 shadow factories were complete or under construction. The Air Ministry was responsible for 16 and, of those 16, 11 were working to full capacity. By that time large numbers of Bristol engines and aircraft were being made in Government owned shadow factories and in the Dominions and other foreign countries.

In February 1944 Parliament was advised there were 175 managing agency schemes or shadow factories.

National Archives catalogue entries
Information concerning the shadow factory plan and shadow factories can be found among the following records and descriptive series list code headings held by The National Archives. For the full set of references (including German shadow factories) see the Catalogue below:

See also

References

External links
 Building Beauforts in Australia
The Shadow Scheme a 1-hour 10 minute documentary released 15 July 2013
 – A contemporary critic of the pre-war expansion of UK aircraft production

 
United Kingdom in World War II
Manufacturing in the United Kingdom